Hakon Magne Valdemar Wrangell (2 January 1859 – 31 August 1942) was a Norwegian ship owner and politician. 

Wrangell was born in Haugesund to telegrapher Hans Marcus Wrangell and Cecilie Tjerandsen. He was elected representative to the Stortinget for the periods 1904–1906, 1907–1909, 1922–1924 and 1925–1927, for the Liberal Left Party. From 1927 to 1930 he was President of the Norwegian Shipowners' Association.

References

1859 births
1942 deaths
People from Haugesund
Free-minded Liberal Party politicians
20th-century Norwegian politicians
Members of the Storting